St Giles' is a wide boulevard leading north from the centre of Oxford, England. At its northern end, the road divides into Woodstock Road to the left and Banbury Road to the right, both major roads through North Oxford. At the southern end, the road continues as Magdalen Street at the junction with Beaumont Street to the west. Also to the west halfway along the street is Pusey Street. Like the rest of North Oxford, much of St Giles' is owned by St John's College.

Church 

At the northern end of St Giles' is St Giles' Church, whose churchyard includes the main War Memorial. The church originates from the 12th century.

Other buildings and structures 

Working from north to south, on the east side are the Lamb & Flag public house (formerly a coaching inn), St John's College, the Oxford Internet Institute (No 1 St Giles'), Balliol College, and Trinity College. On the west side are the International Study Centre of d'Overbroeck's College, St Benet's Hall, the Theology Faculty, Oxford Quaker Meeting House, the Eagle and Child public house (where J. R. R. Tolkien, C. S. Lewis, and other members of the Inklings met; No. 42 was the register office where Lewis contracted a civil marriage in 1956 to Joy Davidman) and is now a dental practice, Regent's Park College (Principal's Lodgings and Senior Tutor's house), Pusey House and St Cross College, Blackfriars, and the Taylor Institution, behind which is the Ashmolean Museum (with its main entrance in Beaumont Street). The southern end meets Magdalen Street at the Martyrs' Memorial (1843), commemorating the Oxford Martyrs (1555–56).

Balliol Hall used to stand on the east side of St Giles' at the point that the Banbury Road and Woodstock Road divide. It was in rooms here that lessons began under A. E. Clarke in September 1877 at a school that was to become known as the Dragon School. The school expanded and moved within two years to Crick Road and then in 1895 to its current location in Bardwell Road in North Oxford.

Fair 

The street is closed to traffic for two days each September for the traditional St Giles' Fair. Formerly, the University Parks was also closed to demonstrate that they are owned by the University of Oxford rather than formally being public. Their closure date is now Christmas Eve.

Gallery

References

External links 
 St Giles': Tour map

Streets in Oxford
Odonyms referring to religion
Parks and open spaces in Oxford
Balliol College, Oxford
St John's College, Oxford
St Cross College, Oxford
Articles containing video clips